Dora María Guadalupe Talamante Lemas (born 7 January 1965) is a Mexican politician affiliated with the PANAL. As of 2013 she served as Deputy of the LXII Legislature of the Mexican Congress representing Sonora.

References

1965 births
Living people
Politicians from Sonora
Women members of the Chamber of Deputies (Mexico)
New Alliance Party (Mexico) politicians
21st-century Mexican politicians
21st-century Mexican women politicians
People from Caborca
Deputies of the LXII Legislature of Mexico
Members of the Chamber of Deputies (Mexico) for Sonora